William Pollard-Urquhart (19 June 1815 – 1 June 1871), was an Irish politician and writer specialising in economic and policy questions of his day. He served as high sheriff of County Westmeath, and sat as Member of Parliament for the county.

Early life
Urquhart, eldest child of William Dutton Pollard (1789–1839), of Kinturk, Castlepollard, co. Westmeath, by his second wife, Louisa Anne, eldest daughter of Admiral Sir Thomas Pakenham, was born at Kinturk on 19 June 1815. He was educated at Harrow and at Trinity College, Cambridge, graduating BA as eighteenth wrangler in 1838, and M.A. in 1843. He kept his terms at the Inner Temple, but was never called to the bar.

Career 
In 1840 he was gazetted High Sheriff of Westmeath, and in 1846, on his marriage, took by royal licence the additional name of Urquhart. He sat in parliament for Westmeath as a liberal from 1852 to 1857, and from 1859 to his death.

Personal life 
On 20 August 1846, he married Mary Isabella, the only daughter of William Urquhart of Craigston Castle, Aberdeenshire. Their second son, Francis Edward Romulus Pollard Urquhart (born 1848), became a major in the Royal Horse Artillery in 1886.

He died at 19 Brunswick Terrace, Brighton, on 1 June 1871.

Works
Pollard-Urquhart was the author of: 
Agricultural Distress and its Remedies (Aberdeen, 1850)
Essays on Subjects of Political Economy (1850)
The Substitution of Direct for Indirect Taxation necessary to carry out the Policy of Free Trade (1851),
Life and Times of Francisco Sforza, Duke of Milan (Edinburgh, 1852, 2 vols; adversely criticised by the ‘Athenæum’)
A short Account of the Prussian Land Credit Companies, with Suggestions for the Formation of a Land Credit Company in Ireland (Dublin, 1853)
The Currency Question and the Bank Charter Committees of 1857 and 1858 reviewed. By an M.P. (1860)
Dialogues on Taxation, local and imperial (1867).

References

External links
 

1815 births
1871 deaths
Alumni of Trinity College, Cambridge
High Sheriffs of County Westmeath
Irish writers
Members of the Parliament of the United Kingdom for County Westmeath constituencies (1801–1922)
People educated at Harrow School
UK MPs 1852–1857
UK MPs 1859–1865
UK MPs 1865–1868
UK MPs 1868–1874
19th-century non-fiction writers